Acauro is a genus of moths in the family Geometridae. It contains the following species:

Acauro rotundus Rindge, 1986

Lithinini
Geometridae genera
Monotypic moth genera